Petalura litorea, commonly known as the coastal petaltail, is an endangered Australian species of dragonfly from the family Petaluridae.

This species originates from south-eastern Queensland and prefers swamp land with thick vegetation, often residing on sword grass. The endangered species description is currently recorded in the New South Wales government Endangered Species listing.

Body
Coastal petaltails have distinctive bodies that are unique to their species. Petaltails' pterostigmata are long and thin, running to and from either side of their wings. Female petaltails have rounded wings, while male petaltails have angular wings.

Mating
Male coastal petaltails have unique, bright orange anal appendages called 'petaltails' that are believed to be used to attract a mate. Once a mate has been attracted, the male and female begin mating, the female positioned upwards towards the sky, and the male in an upside down fashion, lasting for an average of thirty minutes. Once the male and female are finished, the female goes off to lay her eggs in a burrow, often near a body of water. Larvae that nest in these caves often are subject to attack from underwater predators that can easily access the burrow from a nearby body of water. If the larvae survive the incubation process the average coastal petaltail's lifespan is approximately 6 years.

Gallery

See also
 List of Odonata species of Australia

References

Petaluridae
Odonata of Australia
Insects of Australia
Endemic fauna of Australia
Taxa named by Günther Theischinger
Insects described in 1999